Pladasa was a town of ancient Caria. Its name does not appear in ancient authors, but is inferred from epigraphic evidence. It was a polis (city-state) and a member of the Delian League. There was a strong Carian presence in the town's ethnic makeup.
 
Its site is located near Çandüşüren, Asiatic Turkey.

References

Populated places in ancient Caria
Former populated places in Turkey
Greek city-states
Members of the Delian League
Menteşe District
History of Muğla Province